Ab Bid-e Galleh Tavak (also Romanized as Āb Bīd-e Galleh Tavak; also known as ‘Ābīd) is a village in Qaleh-ye Khvajeh Rural District, in the Central District of Andika County, Khuzestan Province, Iran. At the 2006 census, its population was 279, in 48 families.

References 

Populated places in Andika County